Ashina Huaidao (704–708) was a puppet Turkic khagan under the Tang dynasty.

Life 
He was a son of Ashina Huseluo. He was sent to Turgesh leader Sakal by Tang to negotiate submission in 706. After achieving this, he was appointed as Shixing Khagan by Zhongzhong who also appointed Sakal as the Dujun (Commander-in-chief) of the Walu Prefecture (嗢鹿州都督) and the Huaide Commandery Prince (懷徳郡王). However, he soon died and was buried in Xianyang.

Family 
His wife was from the An family of the Six Sogdian Prefecture (六胡州) with whom he had several offspring:

 Ashina Xin - Jiwangjue Khagan (740–742)
 Princess Jiaohe - was married to Shatuo Fuguo (7th generation ancestor of Li Keyong)
 Princess Jinhe - was married to Suluk

References

Sources 

 New Book of Tang, Volume 215

8th-century Turkic people
Ashina house of the Turkic Empire
Tang dynasty generals
Göktürk khagans